Matko Zirdum (born 21 July 1998) is a Croatian professional footballer who plays as a defender for Malaysia Super League club Kuala Lumpur City.

Career

Youth
As a youth player, Zirdum played for Dinamo Zagreb. After that, Zirdum played for the youth academy of Slaven Belupo.

Slaven Belupo

In 2018, he signed for Slaven Belupo.<

Gorica
In 2020, he signed for ND Gorica.

Slaven Belupo
In 2021, he signed for Slaven Belupo. He suffered an in injury while playing for Slaven Belupo.

Kuala Lumpur City
Before the 2023 season, he signed for Kuala Lumpur City.

References

1998 births
Living people
Malaysia Super League players
Kuala Lumpur City F.C. players